Põllküla is a village in Lääne-Harju Parish in Harju County in northern Estonia. It had the population of 38 (1 January 2004).

Põllküla has a station on the Elron western route.

During the years 1942-1944 there was a quarantine camp of war refugees located in Põllküla. The refugees were mainly Finns from Ingria, but also other minorities (Estonians, Latvians, Russians) living in then German-occupied Leningrad oblast. Similar evacuation camps were also in nearby Klooga and Paldiski. The refugees who died in the camp waiting for further evacuation were buried in unidentified mass graves in and around Põllküla. Nowadays there's a memorial for those who died in the camp. In summer 2018 a memorial tablet was opened in honor of the leader of the evacuation of the Finns, professor .

Gallery

References

Villages in Harju County